Kilolo is one of the four districts of the Iringa Region of Tanzania. It is bordered to the north and east by the Morogoro Region, to the south by Mufindi District and to the west by the Iringa Rural District.

According to the 2002 Tanzania National Census, the population of the Kilolo District was 205,081.

Administrative subdivisions

Constituencies
For parliamentary elections, Tanzania is divided into constituencies. As of the 2010 elections Kilolo District had one constituency:
 Kilolo Constituency

Divisions
1. Mazombe
2. Mahenge
3.Kilolo

Wards
, Kilolo District is administratively divided into wards:

 Bomalang'ombe
 Dabaga
 Ibumu
 Idete
 Ihimbo
 Ilula
 Image
 Irole
 Kising'a
 Kimala
 Kitowo
 Lugalo
 Mahenge
 Masisiwe
 Mawambala
 Mlafu
 Mtitu
 Ng'ang'ange
 Ng'uruhe
 Nyalumbu
 Nyanzwa
 Ruaha Mbuyuni
 Udekwa
 Uhambingeto
 Ukumbi
 Ukwega
 Winome

Notes

Districts of Iringa Region